Serpentine Gallery is the debut studio album of gothic rock duo Switchblade Symphony. A deluxe edition with a bonus disc was released in 2005.

Track listing
 "Bad Trash" – 3:42
 "Dissolve" – 4:31
 "Wallflower" – 4:58
 "Wrecking Yard" – 5:09
 "Clown" – 5:35
 "Cocoon" – 2:07
 "Dollhouse" – 4:06
 "Sweet" – 5:43
 "Gutter Glitter" – 3:48
 "Mine Eyes" – 4:24
 "Bloody Knuckles" – 2:41

2005 Re-release Bonus Disc Track Listing
 "Waiting Room"
 "Chain"
 "Rain"
 "Numb"
 "Ride"
 "Novocaine"
 "Wrecking Yard"
 "Sweet" (Burning Mix)
 "Blue"
 Live 105 Radio Interview
 "Clown" music video

References

1995 debut albums
Switchblade Symphony albums
Cleopatra Records albums